Regional Institute of Paramedical Science (also called RIPS) is part of the 
Ministry of Health and Family Welfare's Rs. 804.43 crore upcoming project to enhance the availability of allied health professionals by creating a pool of skilled paramedical workers. A National Institute of Paramedical Sciences was being set up at New Delhi with eight Regional Institutes coming up in other parts of the country.

The 8 Regional Institute of Paramedical Science are proposed to be set up at:
 Bhagalpur, Bihar
 Bhopal, Madhya Pradesh
 Bhubaneshwar, Odisha
 Chandigarh
 Coimbatore, Tamil Nadu
 Hyderabad, Telangana
 Lucknow, Uttar Pradesh
 Nagpur, Maharashtra

References 

Medical and health organisations based in India
Emergency medical services in India
Medical education in India